The village of Khoro is situated in the north-east of Swabi District, Pakistan, between a small area of Dowlat and Dobian. This small area is  famous for Dobian because it contains a doab.  In the past it was not populated that is why it is called Khoro; in Pashto language Khoro means "soil".

75% of the inhabitants depend upon agriculture. There is only one high school, one primary school and three private schools. Due to these institutions five engineers have been graduated.

Populated places in Swabi District